George T. Dunlap Jr. (December 23, 1908 – November 24, 2003) was an American amateur golfer best known for winning the U.S. Amateur.

Dunlap was born in the Arlington section of Kearny, New Jersey. His father was the co-founder of Grosset & Dunlap Publishers.

Dunlap graduated from Princeton University in 1931. He won the  Intercollegiate Individual Championship in 1930 and 1931 and led Princeton to the team victory in 1930.

Dunlap won the U.S. Amateur in 1933 and also won seven North and South Amateurs from 1931 to 1942 including four in a row (1933–36).

Dunlap played on three winning Walker Cup teams; 1932, 1934, and 1936.

Dunlap died in Naples, Florida.

Tournament wins (12)
1930 Intercollegiate Individual Championship
1931 Intercollegiate Individual Championship, North and South Amateur
1932 Long Island Amateur
1933 U.S. Amateur, North and South Amateur
1934 North and South Amateur
1935 North and South Amateur
1936 North and South Amateur, Metropolitan Amateur
1940 North and South Amateur
1942 North and South Amateur

Major championships

Amateur wins (1)

Results timeline

NYF = Tournament not yet founded
DNP = Did not play
"T" indicates a tie for a place
DNQ = Did not qualify for match play portion
R256, R128, R64, R32, R16, QF, SF = Round in which player lost in match play
Green background for wins. Yellow background for top-10

Source for U.S. Amateur: USGA Championship Database

Source for 1933 British Open: www.opengolf.com

Source for 1933 British Amateur: The Glasgow Herald, June 24, 1933, pg. 11.

Source for 1934 Masters: www.masters.com

Source for 1934 British Amateur: The American Golfer, July, 1934, pg. 16.

U.S. national team appearances
Walker Cup: 1932 (winners), 1934 (winners), 1936 (winners)

References

American male golfers
Amateur golfers
Princeton Tigers men's golfers
Golfers from New Jersey
People from Kearny, New Jersey
Sportspeople from Hudson County, New Jersey
1908 births
2003 deaths